A laptop is a personal computer for mobile use. 

Laptop may also refer to:
 Laptop (band), an American band, formed in 1997 by Jesse Hartman
 Laptop (2008 film), a 2008 Malayalam film
 Laptop (2012 film), a 2012 Bengali film
 Laptop (2013 film), a 2013 Russian indie short film

See also